AHK-toong BAY-bi Covered, stylized as (Ăhk-to͝ong Ba͞y-bi) Covered or (Ăℎk-to͝ong Ba͞y-bi) Covered, is a tribute album featuring cover versions of the 12 songs from U2's 1991 record Achtung Baby. It was released on 26 October 2011 as a pack-in CD with the December 2011 issue of Q (issue #305). The magazine commissioned the album to commemorate the 20th anniversary of Achtung Babys original release and Qs 25th anniversary. The magazine's editor-in-chief Paul Rees said, "This is an entirely appropriate way to mark Qs anniversary and that of Achtung Baby, one of the pivotal albums in our lifetime." The performing artists are a mix of U2's contemporaries and successors, including Jack White, Patti Smith, Snow Patrol, Nine Inch Nails, Depeche Mode, The Killers, Garbage and Glasvegas. Although a tribute album, AHK-toong BAY-bi Covered contains a remix of "Even Better Than the Real Thing" that is credited as performed by U2.

On 15 November 2011, the album was made available via digital download through the iTunes Store. All proceeds from digital sales will go to Concern Worldwide, an Ireland-based non-profit organisation that provides aid to the world's poorest countries. Concern's CEO Tom Arnold said, "Offering the proceeds from (Ahk-toong Bay-Bi) Covered to Concern's East Africa appeal also provides a timely reminder that alleviation of the hunger and wider health crisis in the region must not be forgotten and should remain a global priority." Arnold said he was taken aback but delighted when he was asked by U2 lead singer Bono if his organisation would accept all proceeds from sales of the tribute album.

The album debuted at number 53 in the United States with 12,000 copies sold in the first week, and it debuted at number 46 in Canada.

Track listing

Chart performance

References

U2 tribute albums
2011 compilation albums
Compilation albums included with magazines
Rock compilation albums
Charity albums
Mercury Records compilation albums
Universal Music Group compilation albums
Interscope Records compilation albums